Nur, Iran is a city in Mazandaran Province.

Nur in Iran may also refer to:
 Nur-e Olya, a village in Kermanshah Province
 Nur-e Sofla, a village in Kermanshah Province
 Nur, Semnan, a village
 Nur County in Mazandaran Province